Rakib Hossain is a Bangladeshi footballer who plays for Bashundhara Kings in the Bangladesh Football Premier League and for the Bangladesh national football team. As a versatile player, Rakib can play in a multitude of roles but mostly plays as a left winger.

Club career

Chittagong Abahani
He scored a goal against Sheikh Russel KC in 2020-21 Bangladesh Federation Cup quarter final on 1 January 2021, helping Chittagong Abahani reach the semi-finals of the tournament.

Abahani Limited Dhaka
On 20 October 2021, Rakib joined local giants Abahani Limited Dhaka.

International career
Hossain made his senior debut against Sri Lanka during a 2020 Bangabandhu Cup match on 19 January 2020. He was credited with an assist on Mohammad Ibrahim's goal in the 83rd minute.

During the 2021 SAFF Championship game against Nepal, Rakib's back pass to Anisur Rahman Zico lead to confusion in the Bangladesh defense, and after a late challenge by Zico on Nepali striker Anjan Bista he was sent off. 10-men Bangladesh ended up drawing the game 1-1, and thus were unable to reach the finals of the tournament.

On 22 September 2022, Rakib scored his first senior international goal for Bangladesh in 1–0 win over Cambodia.

International goals
Scores and results list Bangladesh's goal tally first.

Bangladesh

References

Living people
1998 births
Bangladeshi footballers
Bangladesh international footballers
Association football forwards
People from Barisal
Abahani Limited (Chittagong) players
Bangladesh Football Premier League players
Rahmatganj MFS players
Abahani Limited (Dhaka) players
Bashundhara Kings players